Julien Humbert (born 23 June 1984) is a French footballer who plays for Racing FC.

External links
 
 

1984 births
Living people
French footballers
FC Rot-Weiß Erfurt players
1. FC Saarbrücken players
MSV Duisburg players
FC Hansa Rostock players
Footballers from Metz
3. Liga players
Association football midfielders
French expatriate sportspeople in Luxembourg
French expatriate sportspeople in Germany
Expatriate footballers in Germany
Expatriate footballers in Luxembourg
French expatriate footballers